St. Peter-Molinis railway station is a Swiss railway station on the Chur–Arosa railway (the "Arosabahn") of the Rhaetian Railway (RhB). It is situated between the villages of Molinis and St. Peter, both within the municipality of Arosa, though slightly nearer to Molinis.

Services
The following services stop at St. Peter-Molinis:

References

External links
 
 

Arosa
Railway stations in Graubünden
Rhaetian Railway stations
Railway stations in Switzerland opened in 1914